Chrysobothris knulli, or Knull's chrysobothris, is a species of metallic wood-boring beetle in the family Buprestidae. It is found in Central America and North America.

References

Further reading

 
 
 

Buprestidae
Articles created by Qbugbot
Beetles described in 1975
Beetles of North America
Beetles of Central America